Tristan Prendergast (born 27 June 1995), is an Australian semi-professional soccer player who plays as a goalkeeper for Blacktown City having been released by A-League side Western Sydney Wanderers in the 2020-2021 pre-season.

Prendergast was signed as cover by Western Sydney Wanderers in July 2020 following Daniel Lopar's return to Europe during the Covid-19 Pandemic.

Prendergast re-signed for Blacktown City in February 2021.

References

External links

1995 births
Living people
Australian soccer players
Association football goalkeepers
Western Sydney Wanderers FC players
Sydney FC players
National Premier Leagues players
A-League Men players